Statistics of the 2013–14 Aruban Division di Honor

League table 
Britannia            17  11  4  2  43-21  37 Piedra Plat
RCA                  17  10  5  2  60-17  35 Oranjestad, Solito
Estrella             17   9  4  4  41-20  31 Santa Cruz, Papilon
Dakota               17   9  3  5  43-21  30 Oranjestad, Dakota
Nacional             17   9  3  5  35-17  30 Palm Beach, Noord
La Fama              17   7  3  7  32-35  24 Savaneta
River Plate          17   6  5  6  40-31  23 Oranjestad, Madiki
Bubali               17   5  4  8  14-18  19 Bubali, Noord
Caiquetio            17   1  4 12   9-51   7 Paradera
Caravel             17   0  1 16   7-93   1 Santa Cruz, Angochi

References 
 RSSSF

External links 
Official website 
Division di Honor 
Aruba National League via FIFA.com

Aruban Division di Honor seasons
Aruba
foot
foot